Hajji Jabagh Qazanoqo (sometimes called as Jabagh al-Sharkassy) was a Kabardian Circassian philosopher, Islamic scholar, poet, military strategist, politician and diplomat who supported the idea of a united and fully independent Northern Caucasus, laying the ideological foundation for the MRNC.

Biography

Early days 
Born in the village of Zeiqo (modern-day Zayukovo) in Kabardia, he dedicated himself to his education. He was a pious Muslim, and completed the hajj, becoming a hajji.

Career

Political career 
Due to his rising fame, he was appointed as the personal advisor of the Kabardian Supreme Prince Aslanbek I. He was trusted by the Supreme Prince for his wisdom. Qazanoqo is credited with reforming the Kabardian justice system based on the Quran and Adyghe Xabze. He was opposed the idea of Circassians living under another country and supported full independence. He believed that the Crimean Tatars wished to annex Circassia, so he suggested Russia as a possible ally. In 1722 he joined diplomatic meetings with Russia. In 1731, he managed to secure a defence agreement with Russia against Tatar raids. However, this alliance came to an end 15 years after his death when Russia attacked Kabardia, starting the Russo-Circassian War.

Military career 
He played a big role in the Battle of Kanzhal, where the Kabardian Circassians won with his strategy.

Death 
Qazanoqo died in 1750 at his home village due to unknown causes.

References 

1685 births
1749 deaths
Circassians
North Caucasian independence activists